Marie Kurková (born ) is a Czech female volleyball player. She is part of the Czech Republic women's national volleyball team.

She participated in the 2014 FIVB Volleyball World Grand Prix.
On club level she played for PVK Olymp Praha in 2014. In 2018 she transferred to college team in Nebraska. With Huskers she ended up as a first runner-up in division 1 volleyball championship, when Nebraska lost against Stanford 2:3.

References

External links
 Profile at FIVB.org

1996 births
Living people
Czech women's volleyball players
Sportspeople from Opava
Setters (volleyball)